Yujia'ao Township is a rural township in Ningxiang City, Hunan Province, China. It is surrounded by Hengshi Town on the west, Huishangang Town and Yuejiaqiao Town on the north, Meitanba Town on the east, and Shuangfupu Town and Dachengqiao Town on the south.

Administrative division
The township is divided into eight villages:
 Yujia'ao 
 Nanling
 Yongquanshan
 Taipingshan
 Huxitang 
 Shenwu
 Gaotian
 Quanlong

Geography
Xiashankou Reservoir is the largest reservoir and largest water body in the township.

Economy

Watermelon and tobacco are important to the economy.

The region is a major source of Chinese coal.

Culture
Huaguxi is the most influence local theater.

Transportation

Provincial Highway
The Provincial Highway S224 runs south to north through the township.

Expressway 
The S71 Yiyang-Loudi-Hengyang Expressway, which connects Yiyang, Loudi and Hengyang, runs south through Hengshi Town, Laoliangcang Town, Liushahe Town and Hutian Town to its southern terminus at the junction of Changsha-Shaoshan-Loudi Expressway, and the north through Huishangang Town to Heshan District of Yiyang.

References

External links
 

Divisions of Ningxiang
Ningxiang